Communauté d'agglomération de la Région de Compiègne et de la Basse Automne is the communauté d'agglomération, an intercommunal structure, centred on the city of Compiègne. It is located in the Oise department, in the Hauts-de-France region, northern France. Created in 2017, its seat is in Compiègne. Its area is 263.8 km2. Its population was 83,159 in 2019, of which 40,615 in Compiègne proper.

Composition
The communauté d'agglomération consists of the following 22 communes:

Armancourt
Béthisy-Saint-Martin
Béthisy-Saint-Pierre
Bienville
Choisy-au-Bac
Clairoix
Compiègne
Janville
Jaux
Jonquières
Lachelle
Lacroix-Saint-Ouen
Le Meux
Margny-lès-Compiègne
Néry
Saintines
Saint-Jean-aux-Bois
Saint-Sauveur
Saint-Vaast-de-Longmont
Venette
Verberie
Vieux-Moulin

References

Compiegne
Compiegne